Dominion is a station on the transitway in Ottawa, Ontario. It is located north of the western edge of Westboro village, where the below-grade transitway segment joins the Sir John A. Macdonald Parkway. The station is named after nearby Dominion Avenue.

Opened on 29 November 1999 as an intermediate station between the long-established Lincoln Fields and Westboro stations, Dominion Station consists of two bus shelters and a grade level crosswalk rather than a true station with platforms. It has no connections to local routes but is actually very close (225m) to the commercial strip on Richmond Road in Westboro village and Westboro Beach.

It serves a primarily residential neighbourhood which previously had only Frequent Route 11 service on Richmond Road for regular transit service. The Académie de Formation Linguistique building at 495 Richmond Road (the former Denis Coolican Building, originally operated by the City of Ottawa) is also served by this station.

This stop is also used frequently by cyclists as there are two bike pathways – one on each side of the parkway – which is part of a large network of cycling paths in the city.

During the summer months, the westbound stop is closed from 9:00AM to 1:00PM on Sundays due to the Alcatel Sunday Bike events, when the Parkway is closed westbound while cyclists use the roadway. Buses travel on Richmond Road, Woodroffe Avenue and Carling Avenue instead. During the detour, a bus stop at the corner of Richmond Road and Golden Avenue is used in lieu of the regular stop at Dominion Station. Eastbound service is not affected by the detour.

Plans to extend the Confederation Line west  to Lincoln Fields and Bayshore Shopping Centre would include construction of a proper, complete rapid transit station for Dominion.

The City proposed changing the name of the station to Kìchì Sìbì to better associate it with the Kitchissippi Lookout on nearby Westboro beach upon inclusion in the Confederation Line Stage 2 expansion. The name, along with the rest of the Stage 2 station names were open to public review until August 26, 2020.

Service

The following routes serve Dominion station as of October 6 2019:

References

External links

1999 establishments in Ontario
Railway stations scheduled to open in 2026
Transitway (Ottawa) stations